The Korea Engineering Award is an award presented to South Koreans and Korean engineers working in domestic universities or research positions. It is currently jointly presented by the Ministry of Science and ICT and the National Research Foundation of Korea. Research achievements are limited to that of a single project conducted in Korea. Potential recipients go through a several stage review which includes consolation with foreign scholars. It is given annually to up to four individuals and is presented with the Korea Science Award. Prize money of KRW 30 million is given in addition to the award.

Fields
The award is given in up to four fields.
 Field 1: Electricity, electronics, metals, computers, information, telecommunications
 Field 2: Machinery, metals, ceramics, aviation, shipbuilding, natural resources, industrial engineering
 Field 3: Chemical engineering, food, polymers, textiles, biotechnology, industrial chemistry
 Field 4: Architecture, civil engineering, environment, energy

Recipients

References

External links
 National Research Foundation of Korea

South Korean awards
Awards established in 1994
1994 establishments in South Korea